The Aquarelle.com Group is a French ecommerce company specialising in flower delivery. Based in the Paris suburb of Levallois-Perret, the organization is privately owned and led by the founders, Henri and François de Maublanc.

Overview 
In 1987, brothers Henri de Maublanc and François de Maublanc opened the first Aquarelle flower shop in Paris. Over the next 10 years, they built up a network of 22 fully owned shops throughout France.
In 1997, the brothers launched Aquarelle.com as an online flower delivery service. Unlike other similar flower delivery services such as Fleurop-Interflora who rely on local florists for the design and delivery of the flowers, Aquarelle design and make their own compositions in their workshops in Brasseuse and use the French express postal service for delivery.
Today, the Aquarelle.com Group employs around 120 people and their online activities have almost completely displaced the offline business. Of the 22 shops in place at their peak, only the Paris and Rennes shops remain.

Activities 
Initially specialising in flowery delivery, Aquarelle began expanding its range in 2005:

 Flowers (since 1997)
 Flowers and chocolates (since 2005)
 Flowers and gift boxes (since 2009)
 Flowers and scented candles (since 2012)

International 
Through partnerships and subsidiaries, Aquarelle.com Group offers similar services in the following countries:

 France: www.aquarelle.com
 Belgium and Luxembourg: www.aquarelle.be
 Netherlands: www.aquarelle.nl
 Germany: www.aquarelle.de
 United Kingdom: www.aquarelle.co.uk
 Spain: www.aquarelle.es
 the United States : www.odealarose.com

In partnership with 123fleurs, the Aquarelle Group offers worldwide services: www.123fleurs.com

Fair trade 
Since 12 April 2016, alongside Système U, the roses delivered by Aquarelle.com in France are certified Fair trade/Max Havelaar.

Sponsoring 
Aquarelle has been primary sponsor for several skippers including Simoné Bianchetti and Yannick Bestaven for major events such as Vendée Globe, the Solidaire du Chocolat, the Mini Transat, and Transat Jacques Vabre. Yannick Bestaven won the Jacques Vabre Class40 in 2011.
Aquarelle also sponsors classical music festivals in Deauville, France – both the “Festival de Pâques“ and the August Festival.

.brand TLD 
Since 2014, Aquarelle.com Group operates the .aquarelle TLD. Implementation started in 2016.

References

Online retailers of France
Florist companies